

This is a list of the Pennsylvania state historical markers in Potter County.

This is intended to be a complete list of the official state historical markers placed in Potter County, Pennsylvania by the Pennsylvania Historical and Museum Commission (PHMC). The locations of the historical markers, as well as the latitude and longitude coordinates as provided by the PHMC's database, are included below when available. There are 11 historical markers located in Potter County.

Historical markers

See also

List of Pennsylvania state historical markers
National Register of Historic Places listings in Potter County, Pennsylvania

References

External links
Pennsylvania Historical Marker Program
Pennsylvania Historical & Museum Commission

Pennsylvania state historical markers in Potter County
Potter County
Tourist attractions in Potter County, Pennsylvania